The Swallow Bluff Island Mounds (40HR16) comprise a Mississippian culture archaeological site located near Saltillo on Swallow Bluff Island in the Tennessee River in Hardin County, Tennessee.

Site
The Swallow Bluff Island Mounds site is the northernmost outpost of the Mississippian culture Shiloh polity, a group of communities centered on the much larger Shiloh or [Savannah Mound sites. The site featured two platform mounds, a plaza, and a village area. When Clarence Bloomfield Moore visited the site in 1914, he recorded the larger mounds' dimensions as a square  base, with a-diameter top platform area, and as being  in height. Excavations in 2003 revealed the mound had been built up in four different construction stages. Moore also described the mounds as being very close to the river, although he did not record how close. By the late 20th century, the river had encroached onto the mound, and by the early 2000s, a significant amount of it had been eroded away.

Excavations
In his 1914 visit, C. B. Moore dug into the main mound looking for pottery and other artifacts. He found over 20 stone box graves at the summit of the mound. After his visit, the site went without notice again, except by locals and looters, for almost 70 years. In the early 1980s, archaeologist Gerald Smith visited the site to investigate suspected pot looters holes, although they may actually been the remnants of Moore's "excavations". After a disastrous flood in 2003, archaeological surveys and excavations were undertaken to learn as much about the main mound as possible before it was completely claimed by the river.

See also
 List of Mississippian sites

References

External links
 Developer Neglects Site, Blames State
 Sites in Need of Protection:Swallow Bluff Island, Tennessee
 Archaeology at Shiloh Indian mounds, 1899-1999 By Paul D. Welch
 AIM Report: Al Gore’s Embarrassing Uncle

Middle Mississippian culture
Archaeological sites in Tennessee
Geography of Hardin County, Tennessee
Mounds in Tennessee